Sarah Louise Willingham (born 21 December 1973) is a British entrepreneur, serial investor, founder and CEO of Nightcap PLC, with extensive experience in the hospitality industry.

Education
In 2004 she completed an MBA at the Cranfield University School of Management.

Career

Businesses
Willingham spent the early years of her career managing some restaurants including Chessageed Delights, Planet Hollywood and Pizza Express. 

In partnership with The Clapham House Group, she bought The Bombay Bicycle Club in 2004, and expanded the company, making it the largest Indian restaurant chain in the United Kingdom. Willingham sold her share back to The Clapham House Group in 2007 where she continued as a main board director responsible for three of their four brands (Tootsies, The Real Greek and The Bombay Bicycle Club) with over 50 restaurants and more than 1,500 employees.

In 2004, Willingham co-established an AIM-listed company, Neutrahealth plc, which acquired six businesses in the vitamin and mineral supplements industry and was sold to Indian company Elder Pharmaceuticals Ltd in 2011.

In April 2008, she co-established a private equity platform in the UK.

In 2010, Willingham invested in the London Cocktail Club. The first cocktail bar opened in 2011 on Goodge Street, London. In February 2012 the London Cocktail Club added their second cocktail bar on Shaftesbury Avenue, Their third opened in Great Portland Street, London in 2013. 

Management Today named her as one of the "35 most successful women under 35" in the UK. In January 2016, Willingham was named one of The Sunday Times''' '500 Most Influential people in Britain'. In 2017 Willingham received an honorary doctorate from Staffordshire University and in 2018 she received honorary doctorates from Cranfield University and Oxford Brookes University in recognition of her contribution to business and entrepreneurship.

Television
Willingham was a restaurant inspector and investor on three series of Raymond Blanc's The Restaurant and as an independent investor on the Sky television series Cooks to Market.

She has appeared on various TV programmes, including Daybreak, This Morning, The Wright Stuff and Sky News.

In March 2015, Willingham was named as one of the new "Dragons" on the BBC television programme Dragons' Den from the thirteenth series which began airing in July 2015. She returned to Dragons' Den for the fourteenth series, beginning in July 2016.

In September 2016, Willingham took part in a celebrity episode of The Chase''.

Personal life
Willingham and her husband Michael live in Brighton and London with their four children.

References

External links

1973 births
Living people
The Restaurant (British TV series)
British restaurateurs
Women restaurateurs
Alumni of Cranfield University
People from Stoke-on-Trent
People educated at Newcastle-under-Lyme School